Tolga Tekin (born 19 March 1973, in Ankara) is a Turkish actor.

After finishing his studies at Private Arı College in 1992, he enrolled in Hacettepe University State Conservatory and graduated in 1996 with a degree in theatre studies. He then passed the entrance exam to the Turkish State Theatres and started working at the Adana State Theatre. After working at the Adana State Theatre between 1996–2004, he joined the Ankara State Theatre. For four years, he had a role in the comedy series Bizim Evin Halleri. He has continued to work at the Ankara State Theatre. In 2020, Tekin had a recurring role in the Netflix original docudrama Rise of Empires: Ottoman. He also appeared in another original series by this platform, titled 50M2.

Filmography 
 Taçsız Prenses - 2023
 Kuruluş Osman - Samsa Çavuş - 2022
 Dünya Hali - Güven - 2021
 50M2 - Mesut - 2021
 Akıncı - Orhan - 2021
 Rise of Empires: Ottoman - 2020
 Bizi Hatırla - Kaan - 2019
 Kelebekler - Cemal - 2018
 Bir Litre Gözyaşı - Muzo - 2018
 Vatanım Sensin - Mehmet Âkif Ersoy - 2018
 Rüzgârda Salınan Nilüfer - Korhan -2016
 Paramparça : Cevdet Mercan - Özkan Gülpınar - 2014
 Behzat Ç. Ankara Yanıyor : Serdar Akar - Gorbaçov -2013
 Muhteşem Yüzyıl : Durul Taylan - Yağmur Taylan - Barbaros Hayreddin Pasha - 2012
 Çıplak Gerçek : Nedim- 2012
 Behzat Ç. Seni Kalbime Gömdüm : Serdar Akar - Gorbaçov - 2011
 Reis: Yunus - 2011
 Zenne: Cihan - 2011
 Kardelen : Mehmet Güneş - Photographer - 2010
 Kapalı Çarşı : Ömür Atay - Mustafa - 2010
 Deniz Yıldızı : Gürsel Ateş - (2009) 
 Bizim Evin Halleri : Samet Polat - Safa - 2008

Awards 
2011: Baykal Saran Theatre Award (Yastık Adam)

References

External links 

1973 births
Turkish male stage actors
Turkish male television actors
Turkish male film actors
Living people
Hacettepe University Ankara State Conservatory alumni
Male actors from Ankara